Markazi Jamiat Ahle Hadith Pakistan (Urdu:, Arabic: المركزى جمعية اهل حديث الباكستان) is a religious organization and political party in Pakistan. It was founded by Ehsan Elahi Zaheer in 1986. JAH is a founding member of Pakistan Democratic Movement (PDM). As of 2018, the party is led by Sajid Mir.

History

Formation 
Jamiat Ahle Hadith was launched as a political party in 1986 by leader Ehsan Elahi Zaheer. A year later, In 1987, Zaheer was martyred.

Split into MJA and JAHP and remerge 

In 1987, following Zaheer's death, JAH later splits up into 2 main factions, namely Markazi Jamiat Ahle Hadith (MJAH) led by Sajid Mir and another faction led by Ehsan Elahi Zaheer's son Ibtisam Elahi Zaheer namely Jamiat Ahle Hadith Pakistan (Elahi Zaheer) (JAHP). But, however in 2018, Ibtisam Elahi Zaheer later announced to remerge his faction along with Sajid Mir's faction.

Ahle Hadith Youth Force

Starting PDM 
On 20 September 2020, JAH's Ameer Sajid Mir attended the All Parties Conference (APC). At the APC, ten parties started the Pakistan Democratic Movement  (PDM) which was made to remove military establishment of Pakistan from politics. JAH also came for PDM's public gatherings and powershows.

Leaders

References

External links

Islamic political parties in Pakistan
Muttahida Majlis-e-Amal
Ahl-i Hadith
Salafi groups